Mori may refer to two families, both Japanese:

 The Mōri clan of the Aki and Nagato provinces.
 The Mori clan (Genji) of Genji (Minamoto) descent, another daimyō family.

It can also refer to a Rajput group of India:

Mori Rajputs of India

Mori is also a family name in Italy.